Sun-young, also spelled Seon-young or Seon-yeong, is a Korean unisex given name, predominantly feminine. It was the ninth-most popular name for baby girls born in South Korea in 1970, and held the same rank in 1980.

Hanja
The meaning of the name depends on the hanja used to write each syllable of the name. There are 41 hanja with the reading "sun" and 34 hanja with the reading "young" on the South Korean government's official list of hanja which may be registered for use in given names. Ways of writing this name in hanja include:

With the first character  (착할 선 chakhal seon), meaning "good" or "kind-hearted":
 (길 영 gil yeong "long", "eternal"). These characters are also used to write the Japanese surname and masculine given name Yoshinaga.
 (꽃부리 영 ggotburi yeong "flower petals"; 뛰어날 영 ddwieonal yeong "heroic"). These characters are also used to write the Japanese masculine given name Yoshihide.
 (영리할 영 yeongrihal yeong "clever"). The second character is not on the South Korean government's list of name hanja.
With the first character  (베풀 선 bepul seon), meaning "to proclaim":

People
People with this name include:

Entertainers
Kim Sun-young (actress born 1976), South Korean actress
Park Sun-young (actress) (born 1976), South Korean actress
Kim Sun-young (actress born 1980), South Korean actress
Hyomin (born Park Sun-young, 1989), South Korean female singer, member of T-ara
Luna (South Korean singer) (born Park Sun-young, 1993), South Korean female singer, member of f(x)
Bak Seon-yeong (voice actress), South Korean voice actress

Sportspeople
Kim Seon-young (judoka) (born 1979), South Korean female judo practitioner
Lee Sun-young (announcer) (born 1982), South Korean female sports announcer
Lee Sun-young (born 1984), South Korean female long-distance runner
Yoo Sun-young (born 1986), South Korean female professional golfer on the LPGA tour
Lim Sun-young (born 1988), South Korean male footballer
Noh Seon-yeong (born 1989), South Korean female speed skater

Other
Lee Sun-young (born 1970), hostage in the 2007 South Korean hostage crisis in Afghanistan
Sun Yung Shin (born 1974), South Korean-born American female writer

See also
List of Korean given names

References

Korean unisex given names